The 1955 IRFU College Draft was the third and final official sports draft held by the Interprovincial Rugby Football Union, a predecessor of the East Division of the Canadian Football League, in the spring of 1955. 41 players were chosen from among eligible players from five eastern universities, McGill University, Queen's University, University of Toronto, University of Western Ontario, and McMaster University. The Ottawa Rough Riders had the first selection, Gino Fracas, in the last draft to feature eastern teams exclusively.

Round one

Round two

Round three

Round four

Round five

Round six

Round seven

Round eight

Round nine

Round ten

Round eleven

References

Canadian College Draft
1955 in Canadian football